Gracilosphya is a genus of longhorn beetles of the subfamily Lamiinae, containing the following species:

 Gracilosphya elongata (Breuning, 1948)
 Gracilosphya hirtipennis Dillon & Dillon, 1952
 Gracilosphya trifasciata Dillon & Dillon, 1952

References

Cyrtinini